Kenneth Norman MacKenzie (born March 1964) is a Canadian-born businessman, and the chairman of BHP since September 2017, and the former CEO of Amcor.

MacKenzie earned a bachelor's degree from McGill University in Canada.

MacKenzie worked for Amcor for 23 years, and was CEO from July 2005 to April 2015.

In June 2017, it was announced that MacKenzie would succeed Jac Nasser as chairman of BHP Billiton in September.

References

1964 births
Canadian businesspeople
Living people
McGill University alumni
BHP people